Vidole is a genus of African araneomorph spiders in the family Phyxelididae, and was first described by Pekka T. Lehtinen in 1967.

Species
 it contains five species, found only in Lesotho and South Africa:

Vidole capensis (Pocock, 1900) (type) – South Africa
Vidole helicigyna Griswold, 1990 – South Africa
Vidole lyra Griswold, 1990 – South Africa
Vidole schreineri (Purcell, 1904) – South Africa
Vidole sothoana Griswold, 1990 – Lesotho, South Africa

See also
 List of Phyxelididae species

References

Araneomorphae genera
Phyxelididae
Taxa named by Pekka T. Lehtinen